This is a list of transfers of La Liga in the La Liga during the winter and summer 2006–07 transfer windows, grouped by club transfers in and out. The Primera División (First Division) of the Liga Nacional de Fútbol Profesional (LFP), commonly known in the English-speaking world as La Liga is the top professional association football division of the Spanish football league system.

Winter Window

Atlético Madrid
In
 Fabiano Eller – Signed From Trabzonspor
 Diego da Silva – Signed From Sporting Braga
Out
 Ismael Falcón – On Loan To Hércules CF
 Zahinos – On Loan To Albacete Balompié
 Gabi – Transferred To Real Zaragoza (In June)
 Diego da Silva – On Loan To Sporting Braga

Athletic Bilbao
In
 Unai Alba – Signed From Barakaldo CF
Out
 Aritz Solabarrieta – Transferred To Atlético Madrid B

Real Betis
In
 Juan Caffa – Signed From Arsenal de Sarandí
 Ilič – On Loan From NK Domžale
 Pancrate – On Loan From Paris Saint-Germain F.C.

Celta de Vigo
In
 Maric – Return From UD Las Palmas
 Bamogo – On Loan From Olympique de Marseille
 Areias – On Loan From F.C. Porto
Out

Deportivo de La Coruña
Out
 Rodri – On Loan To UD Almería
 Iván Carril – On Loan To CF Palencia
 Ángel Guirado – On Loan To CD Lugo
 Álvaro Arbeloa – Transferred To Liverpool F.C.

RCD Espanyol
Out
 Armando Sá – On Loan To Leeds United A.F.C.
 Albert Yagüe – On Loan To Lorca Deportiva CF
 Jonathan Soriano – On Loan To Polideportivo Ejido
 Sergio Sánchez – On Loan To Real Madrid Castilla
 Fredson – On Loan To São Paulo
 César Peixoto – Released

Getafe CF
In
 Verpakovskis – On Loan From FC Dynamo Kyiv
Out
 Jajá – On Loan To K.R.C. Genk
 Paunović – Transferred To FC Rubin Kazan

Gimnàstic de Tarragona
In
 Rubén Castro – On Loan From Deportivo de La Coruña
 César Navas – On Loan From Málaga CF
 Jose Maria Calvo – On Loan From CA Boca Juniors
 Chabaud – Signed From R. Charleroi S.C.
 Grahn – Signed From Odense BK
Out
 Cáceres – Transferred To UANL Tigres
 Manolo Martínez – Transferred To CD Tenerife
 Abel Buades – Transferred To Cádiz CF

Levante UD
In
 Gustavo Reggi – Signed From UD Las Palmas
 Salva Ballesta – On Loan From Málaga CF
Out
 Carmelo – On Loan To Hércules CF
 Manchev – On Loan To Real Valladolid
 Luyindula – Transferred To Paris Saint-Germain F.C.

Racing de Santander
Out
 Neru – Transferred To Cádiz CF
 Walid Regragui – Transferred To Dijon FCO

RCD Mallorca
In
 Óscar Trejo – Signed From CA Boca Juniors
Out
 Pisculichi – Transferred To Al-Arabi Sports Club
 Daniel Kome – Transferred To Real Valladolid

CA Osasuna
Out
 Ivan Rosado – Transferred To Málaga CF

Real Madrid
In
 Marcelo – Signed From Fluminense Football Club
 Higuaín – Signed From River Plate
 Gago – Signed From Boca Juniors

Out
 Beckham – Transferred To Los Angeles Galaxy (In June)
 Ronaldo – Transferred To A.C. Milan

Real Sociedad
In
 Victor López – Signed From Arsenal de Sarandí
 Germán Herrera – Signed From Grêmio Foot-Ball Porto Alegrense
 Sávio – Signed From Clube de Regatas do Flamengo
 Jesuli – On Loan From Sevilla FC
Out
 Javier Garrido – Transferred To Manchester City F.C.
 Fábio Felício – Transferred To FC Rubin Kazan
 Cifuentes – On Loan To SD Ponferradina
 Imanol Agirretxe – On Loan To CD Castellón
 Rossato – On Loan To U.D. Leiria

Recreativo de Huelva
Out
 Antonio Calle – Transferred To Albacete Balompié
  Juvenal – Transferred To CD Tenerife

Sevilla FC
In
 Kerzhakov – Signed From FC Zenit Saint Petersburg
 Fazio – Signed From Ferro Carril Oeste
Out
 Jesuli – On Loan To Real Sociedad
 Kepa Blanco – On Loan To West Ham United F.C.
 Bruno Herrero – On Loan To Real Murcia
 Antonio López – Transferred To CD Castellón

Valencia CF
Out
 Tavano – On Loan To A.S. Roma
 Roberto Ayala – Transferred To Villarreal CF (In June)

Villarreal CF
In
 Matías Fernández – Signed From Colo-Colo
 Jon Dahl Tomasson – On Loan From VfB Stuttgart
 Roberto Ayala – Signed From Valencia CF (In June)
 Martín Cáceres – Signed From Defensor Sporting

Out
 Juan Román Riquelme – On Loan To Club Atlético Boca Juniors

Real Zaragoza
In
 Gustavo Nery – On Loan From SC Corinthians
 Gabi – Transferred From Atlético Madrid (In June)

Out
 Leo Ponzio – Transferred To Club Atlético River Plate

Summer Window

Athletic Bilbao
In:
 Josu Sarriegi – Signed From Deportivo Alavés
 Zubiaurre – Signed From Real Sociedad
 Ibón Gutiérrez – Return From CD Numancia
 Gorka Azkorra – Return From CD Numancia
 Gabilondo – Signed From Real Sociedad
 Javi Martínez – Signed From CA Osasuna
 Alex García – Signed From Racing B

Out:
 Javier Tarantino – On Loan To CD Numancia
 Julen Guerrero –  Retired
 Gorka Azkorra – Transferred To Albacete Balompié
 Kevin Lacruz – Transferred To RCD Espanyol
 Felipe Guréndez – Transferred To CD Numancia
 Joseba Arriaga – Transferred To UD Las Palmas
 Ibón Gutiérrez – On Loan To CD Castellón
 Endika Bordas –  Transferred To CE L'Hospitalet
 Carlos Gurpegi –  Sanctioned

Atlético Madrid

In:
 Sergio Agüero – Signed From Independiente
  Mariano Pernía – Signed From Getafe CF
  Kiki Musampa – Return From Manchester City F.C.
  Costinha – Signed From FC Dynamo Moscow
  Yourkas Seitaridis – Signed From FC Dynamo Moscow
  Zé Castro – Signed From Académica de Coimbra
 Miguel de las Cuevas – Signed From Hércules CF
 Raúl Medina – Return From Ciudad de Murcia
 Mista – Signed From Valencia CF
 Jurado – Signed From Real Madrid
  Maniche – Signed From FC Dynamo Moscow

Out:
  Javier Pinola – On Loan To 1. FC Nürnberg
 Manu del Moral – Transferred To Getafe CF
  Cosmin Contra – Transferred To Getafe CF
 Juanma Ortiz – On Loan To Polideportivo Ejido
 Gonzalo Colsa – Transferred To Racing de Santander
 Jorge Larena – Transferred To Celta de Vigo
 Sosa – On Loan To River Plate
 Braulio – On Loan To UD Salamanca
 Toché – On Loan To Real Valladolid
 Gª Calvo – Transferred To Real Valladolid
 Molinero – On Loan To Málaga CF
 Mateja Kežman – Transferred To Fenerbahçe SK
 Ariel Ibagaza – Transferred To RCD Mallorca
 Juan Velasco – Transferred To RCD Espanyol
 Mario Suárez – On Loan To Real Valladolid
  Musampa – Transferred To Trabzonspor

FC Barcelona
In:
   Javier Saviola – Return From Sevilla FC
  Eiður Guðjohnsen – Signed From Chelsea F.C.
   Gianluca Zambrotta – Signed From Juventus F.C.
   Lilian Thuram – Signed From Juventus F.C.

Out:
   Henrik Larsson – Transferred To Helsingborgs IF
   Gabri – Transferred To AFC Ajax
   Rüştü Reçber – Transferred To Fenerbahçe SK
   Maxi López – On Loan To RCD Mallorca
   Mark van Bommel – Transferred To FC Bayern Munich

  Francisco Martos – Transferred To PFC CSKA Sofia
  Fernando Navarro – Transferred To RCD Mallorca
  Dani Fernández – Transferred To Metalurh Donetsk
  Cristian Hidalgo – Transferred To Deportivo La Coruña
  Óscar López – Transferred To Real Betis
  Damià Abella – Transferred To Real Betis
  Rodri – Transferred To Deportivo de La Coruña
  Joan Verdú – Transferred To Deportivo de La Coruña

Real Betis
In

Total Spent: €18,462,000

Out

Total Received: €42,000,000

Loaned players

 (to Mérida UD until June 2008)
  (to CA Osasuna until June 2007)
 (to Gimnàstic de Tarragona until June 2007)

Celta de Vigo
In:
 Antonio Guayre – Signed From Villarreal CF
  George Lucas – Signed From Atlético Mineiro
 Jorge Larena – Signed From Atlético Madrid
 Toni Moral – Return From CD Tenerife
 Nenê – Signed From Deportivo Alavés
 Gabriel Tamaș – Signed From Spartak Moscow
  Pablo García – On Loan From Real Madrid

Out:
  David Silva – Return To Valencia CF
  José Enrique – Return To Valencia CF
  Edú – Transferred To Real Betis
  Juan Sánchez – Retired
 Sergio – Transferred To Real Zaragoza
  Iago Bouzón – On Loan To Recreativo de Huelva
 Toni Moral – Transferred To Deportivo Alavés
 Carlos Vela – On Loan To UD Salamanca
 Sebastián Méndez – Transferred To San Lorenzo de Almagro

RC Deportivo La Coruña
In:
 Alberto Lopo – Signed From RCD Espanyol
  Lionel Scaloni – Return From West Ham United F.C.
 Pablo Álvarez – Signed From Sporting de Gijón
 Juan Rodríguez – Signed From Málaga CF
 Riki – Signed From Getafe CF
  Rodolfo Bodipo – Signed From Deportivo Alavés
 Cristian Hidalgo – Signed From FC Barcelona B
 Antonio Barragán – Signed From Liverpool F.C. 
  Fabián Estoyanoff – On Loan From Valencia CF
 Rodri – Signed From FC Barcelona B
 Álvaro Arbeloa – Signed From Real Madrid Castilla
 Joan Verdú – Signed From FC Barcelona B
  Dudu Aouate – Signed From Racing de Santander
 Antonio Tomás – Signed From Racing de Santander
  Filipe Luís Kasmirski – On Loan From C.A. Rentistas

Out:
 Paco Gallardo – Return To Sevilla FC
 Enrique Romero – Transferred To Real Betis
 Dani Mallo – Transferred To S.C. Braga
 Xisco – On Loan To UD Vecindario
 Iván Carril – On Loan To UD Vecindario
 José Francisco Molina – Transferred To Levante UD
 César – Transferred To Levante UD
 Héctor – Transferred To RCD Mallorca
 Pedro Munitis – Transferred To Racing de Santander
 Victor – Transferred To Panathinaikos
 Ángel Guirado – On Loan To UD Vecindario
 Senel – On Loan To Málaga B
 Momo – On Loan To Racing de Santander
 Rubén Castro – On Loan To Gimnàstic de Tarragona
 Pablo Amo – On Loan To Recreativo de Huelva
 Antonio Tomás – On Loan To Recreativo de Huelva
 Diego Tristán – Transferred To RCD Mallorca
  Lionel Scaloni – Transferred To Racing de Santander

RCD Espanyol
In:
  Riera – Return From Manchester City F.C.
   Moha Signed From CA Osasuna
  J. Soriano – Return From UD Almería
  Lacruz – Signed From Athletic de Bilbao
  Rufete – Signed From Valencia CF
  Jônatas – Signed From Clube de Regatas do Flamengo
  Velasco – Signed From Atlético Madrid

Out:
  Martín Posse – Transferred To Club Almagro
  Lopo – Transferred To Deportivo de La Coruña
   Pochettino – Retired
  Juanfran – Return To Real Madrid Castilla
   Domi – Transferred To Olympiacos
   Jordi Cruyff – Transferred To Metalurh Donetsk
  Jofre – Transferred To Real Murcia
  Robusté – On Loan To Polideportivo Ejido

Getafe CF
In:
  Nacho – Signed From Málaga CF
  Manu del Moral – On Loan From Atlético Madrid
  David Sousa – Signed From Real Valladolid
  Alexis – Signed From Málaga CF
   Cosmin Contra – Signed From Atlético Madrid
  Javier Casquero – Signed From Racing de Santander
  David Cortés – Signed From RCD Mallorca
  Juan Ángel Albín – Signed From Club Nacional de Football
  Roberto Abbondanzieri – Signed From Boca Juniors
  Lucas Licht – Signed From Club de Gimnasia y Esgrima La Plata

Out:
   Mariano Pernía – Transferred To Atlético Madrid
  Jaime Gavilán – Return To Valencia CF
   Gheorghe Craioveanu – Retired
  Riki – Transferred To Deportivo de La Coruña
  Diego Rivas – Transferred To Real Sociedad
  Nano – Transferred To Cádiz CF
  Juan Calatayud – Return To Málaga CF
  Aníbal Matellán – Transferred To Gimnàstic de Tarragona
  David Cubillo – Transferred To Rayo Vallecano
  Jajá – On loan To Clube de Regatas do Flamengo

Gimnàstic  de Tarragona
In:
 Mingo – Signed From Albacete Balompié
 Juan – Signed From Sporting de Gijón
  Albano Bizzarri – Signed From Real Valladolid
 Alejandro Campano – Signed From RCD Mallorca
 Aníbal Matellán – Signed From Getafe CF
 David Generelo – On Loan From Real Zaragoza
 David Pirri – Signed From Albacete Balompié
 Javier Portillo – Signed From Real Madrid
 Ariza Makukula – On Loan From Sevilla FC
 Julio Cáceres – On Loan From FC Nantes Atlantique
 Gil – Signed From Cruzeiro
 Óscar López – On Loan From Real Betis

Out:
  Cristian Lupidio – Return To Hércules CF
 Diego Torres – Transferred To Rayo Vallecano
 Lluis Codina – Transferred To SD Eibar
 Diego Reyes – Transferred To Córdoba CF
 Bolo – Transferred To CD Numancia
 Álex Pérez – Transferred To Real Madrid Castilla
 Abdulrazak Ekpoki – Transferred To UD Vecindario

Levante UD

In:
 Manolo Gaspar – Signed From UD Almería
 Nino – Signed From Elche CF
  Frédéric Déhu – Signed From Olympique de Marseille
  Laurent Robert – Signed From S.L. Benfica
  Damiano Tommasi – Signed From A.S. Roma
 César – Signed From Deportivo de La Coruña
 Álvaro – Signed From Real Zaragoza
 Albert Meyong – Signed From CF Os Belenenses
   Olivier Kapo – Signed From Juventus F.C.
  Mathieu Berson – Signed From Aston Villa
 Zé Maria – Signed From Internazionale FC
 José Francisco Molina – Signed From Deportivo La Coruña
  Péguy Luyindula – On Loan From Olympique de Marseille

Out
 Javi Rodríguez – On Loan To Lorca Deportiva CF
 Juan Carlos Ceballos – Transferred To Ciudad de Murcia
 Fernando Lombardi – Return To Paraná Clube
 Edwin Congo – Transferred To Sporting de Gijón
 José Antonio Culebras – Transferred To CD Tenerife
 Sandro – Transferred To Málaga CF
 Jesule – Transferred To Málaga CF
 Nagore – Transferred To CD Numancia

Real Madrid CF

In:
  Mahamadou Diarra – Signed From Lyon (€26m) 
  Fabio Cannavaro – Signed From Juventus F.C. (€7m) 
  Emerson – Signed From Juventus F.C. (€16m) 
  Ruud van Nistelrooy – Signed From Manchester United (€15m)
 José Antonio Reyes On Loan From Arsenal F.C.

Out:
  Zinedine Zidane – Retired  
 Roberto Soldado – On Loan To CA Osasuna
 Álvaro Arbeloa – Transferred To Deportivo de La Coruña (€1,3m)
 Jurado – Transferred To Atlético Madrid (€3m)
 Javier Portillo Transferred To Gimnàstic de Tarragona (Free transfer)
  Javier Balboa – On Loan To Racing de Santander
 Rubén – Transferred To Racing de Santander
  Carlos Diogo – On Loan To Real Zaragoza
  Pablo García – On Loan To Celta de Vigo
 Juanfran – Transferred To  CA Osasuna
  Thomas Gravesen – Transferred To Celtic
  Jonathan Woodgate – On Loan To Middlesbrough
 Borja Fernández – Transferred To Real Valladolid
 Júlio Baptista – On Loan To Arsenal F.C.

RCD Mallorca
In:
 Jordi López – Signed From Sevilla FC
 Varela – Signed From Real Betis
  Maxi López – On Loan From FC Barcelona
 Fernando Navarro – Signed From FC Barcelona
 Javier Dorado – Signed From Sporting de Gijón
 Héctor – Signed From Deportivo de La Coruña
  Daniel Kome – Return From Ciudad de Murcia
 Iván Ramis – Return From Real Valladolid
 Ariel Ibagaza – Signed From Atlético Madrid
 Boško Janković – Signed From Red Star Belgrade
 Diego Tristán – Signed From Deportivo La Coruña
Out:
 Borja – Return To Real Madrid
 Yoshito Ōkubo – Return To Cerezo Osaka
 Braulio – Return To Atlético Madrid
 David Cortés – Transferred To Getafe CF
 Yordi – Transferred To Xerez CD
 Alejandro Campano – Transferred To Gimnàstic de Tarragona
  Alessandro Potenza  – Return To Internazionale
 Eduardo Tuzzio – Transferred To River Plate
 Francisco Maciel – Transferred To Racing Club de Avellaneda
 Andrija Delibašić – On Loan To AEK Athens F.C.
 Paíto – On Loan To S.C. Braga
  Cristiano Doni – Transferred To Atalanta B.C.

CA Osasuna
In:
 Héctor Font – Signed From Villarreal CF
 Javad Nekounam – Signed From Sharjah FC
 Iván Rosado – Return From Xerez CD
  Jaime Penedo – Signed From Cagliari Calcio
 Roberto Soldado – On Loan From Real Madrid
 Juanlu – On Loan From Real Betis
 Juanfran – Signed From Real Madrid

Out:
  Marcelo Sosa – Return To Atlético Madrid
   Moha Transferred To RCD Espanyol
  Juanma Ortiz – Return To Atlético Madrid
  Fran Moreno – On Loan To CD Numancia
  Rafael Clavero – Transferred To CD Tenerife
 Iván Rosado – Transferred To Málaga CF

Real Racing Club Santander
In:
  Cristian Álvarez – Return From CD Tenerife
 David Aganzo – Return From Beitar Jerusalem FC
 Gonzalo Colsa – Signed From Atlético Madrid
 Luis Fernández – Signed From Real Betis
 Pedro Munitis – Signed From Deportivo de La Coruña
 Momo – On Loan From Deportivo de La Coruña
 Juan Calatayud – Signed From Getafe CF
  Javier Balboa – On Loan From Real Madrid
 Rubén González – Signed From Real Madrid
 Antonio Tomás – On Loan From Deportivo de La Coruña
 Toño – On Loan From Recreativo de Huelva
 Nikola Žigić – Signed From Red Star Belgrade
  Lionel Scaloni- Signed From Deportivo de La Coruña
Out:
 Rubén Castro – On Loan To Gimnàstic de Tarragona
 Antoñito – Return To Sevilla FC
 Pablo Casar – Transferred To Deportivo Alavés
 Javier Casquero – Transferred To Getafe CF
 Damiá – Return To FC Barcelona
 Jonatan Valle – Transferred To Málaga CF
 Mauricio Pinilla – Transferred To Heart of Midlothian
 Dudu Aouate – Transferred To Deportivo de La Coruña
 Álex García – Transferred To Athletic Bilbao B
 Samuel San José – On Loan To Sporting de Gijón
 Antonio Tomás – Transferred To Deportivo de La Coruña
 Fernando Marqués – Transferred To Atlético Madrid B
 Rubén García – On Loan To UE Lleida
  Stéphane Dalmat Transferred To FC Girondins de Bordeaux
  Wilfried Dalmat Transferred To R.A.E.C. Mons

Sevilla FC
In:
  Andreas Hinkel – Signed From VfB Stuttgart
  Christian Poulsen – Signed From FC Schalke 04
 Antonio López – Return From Málaga CF
 David Cobeño – Signed From Real Madrid Castilla
  Duda – Signed From Málaga CF
 Javier Chevantón – Signed From AS Monaco

Out
 Carlitos – Transferred To Granada CF
  Javier Saviola – Return To FC Barcelona
 Hugo Notario – Transferred To Real Murcia
 Jordi López – Transferred To RCD Mallorca
 Manuel Blanco – On Loan To CD Tenerife
 Antoñito – Transferred To Real Murcia
 Francisco Gallardo – Transferred To Real Murcia
 Carlos Aranda – Transferred To Real Murcia
 Ariza Makukula – Transferred To Gimnàstic de Tarragona

Real Sociedad
In:
   Fábio Felício – Signed From UD Leiria
   Adriano Rossato – Return From S.C. Braga
  Juanito – Signed From Deportivo Alavés
  Claudio Bravo – Signed From Colo-Colo
  Gerardo – Signed From Málaga CF
  Diego Rivas – Signed From Getafe CF

Out
   Nihat Kahveci – Transferred To Villarreal CF
   Mark González – Return To Liverpool F.C.
  Jhon Viáfara – Return To Portsmouth F.C.
   Alberto – Transferred To Real Valladolid
  Óscar de Paula – Transferred To Cádiz CF
  Igor Gabilondo – Transferred To Athletic de Bilbao
  José Barkero – Transferred To Albacete Balompié
  Gorka Larrea – On Loan To UD Almería
  Markel Bergara – On Loan To UD Vecindario
   Jérémie Bréchet – Transferred To FC Sochaux-Montbéliard
  Sergio Boris – Transferred To Numancia

RC Recreativo de Huelva
In:
 César Arzo – On Loan From Villarreal CF
 Jesús Vázquez – Signed From CD Tenerife
 Edu Moya – Signed From CD Tenerife
 Javier López Vallejo – On Loan From Villarreal CF
 Santi Cazorla – Signed From Villarreal CF
 Iago Bouzón – On Loan From Celta de Vigo
 Dani Bautista – Signed From Sevilla FC
 Mario – Signed From Real Valladolid
 Poli – Signed From Deportivo Alavés
 Bertrand Laquait – Signed From Charleroi
 Florent Sinama Pongolle – On Loan From Liverpool
 Beto – On Loan From Bordeaux
 Pablo Amo – On Loan From Deportivo
 Javi Guerrero – Signed From Celta de Vigo
 Juanma Gómez – On Loan From Levante

Out
  Ignacio Benítez – Transferred To Hércules CF
  Xavi Jimenez – On Loan To Ciudad de Murcia
  Mateo – Transferred To Deportivo Alavés
  Gastón Casas – Transferred To Elche CF
 Valencia – Return To Villarreal CF
 Iker Begoña – Transferred To Lorca Deportiva CF
 Toño – Transferred To Racing de Santander
 Ramón – Transferred To Real Murcia
 Galván – Transferred To UE Lleida
 Valero – Transferred To UDA Gramenet

Valencia CF
In: 
  David Silva – Return From Celta de Vigo
  Gavilán – Return From Getafe CF
   Bernardo Corradi – Return From Parma F.C.
   Stefano Fiore – Return From ACF Fiorentina
  Javier Garrido – Return From Albacete Balompié
  Fernando Morientes – Signed From Liverpool F.C.
  Asier del Horno – Signed From Chelsea
   Francesco Tavano – Signed From Empoli F.C.
  Joaquín – Signed From Real Betis (€25m)

Out:
   Amedeo Carboni – Retired
   Marco Di Vaio -Transferred To AS Monaco
   Fábio Aurélio – Transferred To Liverpool F.C.
  José Enrique – Transferred To Villarreal CF
   Fabián Estoyanoff – On Loan To Deportivo de La Coruña
   Caneira – On Loan To Sporting Clube de Portugal
   Bernardo Corradi – Transferred To Manchester City F.C.
   Francisco Rufete – Transferred To RCD Espanyol
   Mista – Transferred To Atlético Madrid
   Pablo Aimar – Transferred To Real Zaragoza
   Javier Garrido – Transferred To Lorca Deportiva CF
   Patrick Kluivert – Transferred To PSV Eindhoven
    Stefano Fiore – On Loan To Torino FC

Villarreal CF
In:
  Nihat Kahveci- Signed From Real Sociedad
  Robert Pires – Signed From Arsenal F.C.
 Cani – Signed From Real Zaragoza
 José Enrique – Signed From Valencia CF
  Leandro Somoza- Signed from CA Vélez Sársfield
  Fabricio Fuentes – Signed From Club Atlas
  Pascal Cygan – Signed From Arsenal F.C.

Out:
 Juan Pablo Sorín – Transferred To Hamburger SV
 Antonio Guayre – Transferred To Celta de Vigo
 César Arzo – On Loan To Recreativo de Huelva
 Roger García – Transferred To Ajax Amsterdam
 Xisco Nadal – Transferred To Hércules CF
 Javier López Vallejo – On Loan To Recreativo de Huelva
 Héctor Font – Transferred To CA Osasuna
 Santi Cazorla – Transferred To Recreativo de Huelva
 Valencia On Loan  To Wigan Athletic
 Javier Calleja – Transferred To Málaga CF
 Carlos Alcántara – On Loan To Real Jaén

Real Zaragoza
In:
  Andrés D'Alessandro – On Loan From VfL Wolfsburg
 Sergio – Signed From Celta de Vigo
 Juanfran – Signed From Beşiktaş
 Corona – Return From Albacete Balompié
 Pablo Aimar – Signed From Valencia CF
 Gerard Piqué – On Loan From Manchester United
 Miguel Martínez – Return From UE Lleida
 Antonio Longás – Promoted From Real Zaragoza B
  Carlos Diogo – On Loan From Real Madrid

Out:
  Sávio – Transferred  To Flamengo
 Cani – Transferred To Villarreal CF
 Delio Toledo – Transferred To Kayserispor
 Piti – On Loan To Hércules CF
 Capi – Transferred To Real Murcia
 Álvaro – Transferred To Levante UD
 David Generelo – On Loan To Gimnàstic de Tarragona
 Corona – On Loan To UD Almería
 Raúl Valbuena – On Loan To Albacete Balompié

External links
 lfp.es > PRIMERA DIVISIÓN > Inscripciones

2006-07
2006–07 La Liga
Spain
Spain